The Beneš-Mráz Bibi was a 1930s Czechoslovak two-seat touring aircraft.

Design and development
The Bibi was designed and manufactured by Beneš-Mráz, developed from the Beta-Minor design. The Bibi was a lighter, smaller aircraft in which the seats were side-by-side instead of in tandem, and the cockpits were fully enclosed, retaining the Beta-Minor's cantilever low-wing cantilever monoplane layout, with fixed tailwheel undercarriage. Development of the Bibi began with the Be-501 two-seat cabin tourer, and culminated with the Be-555 Super Bibi.

Operational history
One example of the Be-550 Bibi (OK-BET) was imported into the United Kingdom, stored during World War II, then registered as G-AGSR until a fatal crash in 1951.

Variants
Be-501 Bibi
Single seat, initial development aircraft for the Bibi cabin tourer.
Be-502 Bibi
Single seat development prototype for the Bibi series.
Be-550 Bibi
Initial production version introduced in 1936, with at least six built, including single exports to Egypt and the UK.
Be-555 Super Bibi
The final iteration of the Bibi with many improvements. Production continued after the start of WWII, with at least ten built.

Specifications  (Be-550)

Notes

References

Jackson, A.J. (1974). British Civil Aircraft since 1919. Putnam 
 Němeček, V. (1968). Československá letadla. Praha: Naše Vojsko.
 
 

1930s Czechoslovakian sport aircraft
Low-wing aircraft
Single-engined tractor aircraft
Bibi
Aircraft first flown in 1936